Lewart Lubartów is a Polish professional football team based in Lubartów. They currently play in IV liga Lublin, the fifth tier of the Polish football league.

History
Lewart Lubartów was formed in May 1923. In the 1999–2000 season, club gained promotion to the third tier of the Polish football league for the first time in its history. In the 2001/2002 season Lewart reached their highest ever league position of eight in the III liga. They have spent four seasons at this level, most recently in 2004–05.

2020–21 Lewart Lubartów season

Stadium
The club play their home matches at Stadion MOSIR w Lubartowie, which has a capacity of 1,500.

References

External links
 

Football clubs in Poland
Association football clubs established in 1923
1923 establishments in Poland
Lubartów County
Football clubs in Lublin Voivodeship